Global Climate Action, originally known as Non-state Actor Zone for Climate Action (NAZCA), is a web portal launched in 2014 by the United Nations Framework Convention on Climate Change (UNFCCC). The purpose of the website is to provide information about climate action around the globe. The site contains commitments of countries, cities, businesses and international coalitions, including those that are part of the Paris Agreement. , the portal contains 24,910 actions committed to by 17,025 actors.

Additional pledges were made at the 2019 UN Climate Action Summit and later that year. All the information about the pledges is streamed to the site, which helps the scientific community track their fulfillment.

References

External links
Official Website
CDP Global

Web portals
United Nations Framework Convention on Climate Change
Climate action plans